Valenictus is an extinct genus of Odobenidae from the Pliocene of California.

Description
 
Valenictus is related to the modern-day walrus, but lacked all teeth both in the lower and upper jaw except for the two tusks.

References

Pliocene extinctions
Prehistoric pinnipeds of North America
Odobenids
Prehistoric carnivoran genera
Pliocene pinnipeds
Pliocene mammals of North America
Fossil taxa described in 1961